HCFA may refer to:
 American Health Care Act of 2017, also known as the Health Care Freedom Act
 Centers for Medicare and Medicaid Services, formerly known as the Health Care Financing Administration